The 2008–09 Speedcar Series was the second and final season Speedcar Series championship. The championship consisted of five meetings, starting on December 5, 2008 at the Dubai Autodrome in the United Arab Emirates and finishing at the Bahrain International Circuit on April 25, 2009. Gianni Morbidelli finished as champion, pipping defending champion Johnny Herbert by just two points.

Teams and drivers
All of the teams used the Speedcar V8 vehicle with tyres supplied by Michelin.

Calendar

Championship Standings

Drivers

Points were awarded to the top eight classified finishers using the following structure:

Notes:
  – Driver did not finish the race, but was classified as he completed more than 90% of the race distance.

Teams

Notes:
  – Driver did not finish the race, but was classified as he completed more than 90% of the race distance.

References

External links
Driver Database

Speedcar Series seasons
Speedcar Series season
Speedcar Series season